Anamoq (also Romanized as Anāmoq, Anāmaq, and Anāmeq; also known as Anama) is a village in Mishab-e Shomali Rural District, in the Central District of Marand County, East Azerbaijan Province, Iran. At the 2006 census, its population was 1,494, in 389 families.

References 

Populated places in Marand County